Olena Lvivna Kulchytska (15 September 1877 – 8 March 1967) was a Ukrainian artist, painter, and civil activist.

Biography

Family 
She was born in the town of Berezhany, Galicia in the modern-day Ternopil Oblast of Ukraine. Her father was Lev Teodorovich Kulchytsky (1843 – December 4, 1909), a court counselor, lawyer, public figure, and member of many societies. Her mother was Maria Yakivna Kulchytska (? – December 29, 1939).

Learning and the first steps in art 
In 1894 she graduated from an 8th grade school at the monastery in Lviv. For several months between 1901 and 1902, she and her sister Olga attended the  where she received her first lessons in watercolor.

Olena Kulchytska completed her art training at the private studio run by R. Bratkowski and S. Batowski-Kaczor in Lviv (1901–3) and the Vienna School of Industrial Design (1903–1908). After graduating, she took a year to travel through the major European art centres, including Munich, Paris, and London. Later in life, she worked as an art teacher at secondary schools in Lviv (Queen Jadwiga of Poland Gymnasium, 1909-1910) and Przemyśl girl school (1910–1938).

Privacy 
The artist had no family of her own, she devoted her life entirely to art.

Work
Kulchytska’s first solo exhibition took place in Lviv in 1909. It showcased her engravings, prints, watercolours, woodcuts, and filigrees. The exhibition was celebrated by the early-modernist Ukrainian artists, for instance, Ivan Trush. Kulchytska’s work combined the folk art traditions of the Western Ukraine, particularly, the Hutsuls, with the stylistic innovations of the European Sezession. Later, she exhibited her works in Kraków, Warsaw, Poznań, Kyiv, and other European cities.

During 1920-1930, Kulchytska made major contribution to the Ukrainian book design. She illustrated various works by Ivan Franko, Mykhailo Kotsiubynsky, Vasyl Stefanyk, and Yurii Fedkovych, as well as more than 70 books for children for the series «For Our Littlest Ones», which included Oscar Wilde’s ‘The Star-Child’ (1920).

In the field of applied arts, she designed 80 kilims in collaboration with her sister Olha.

Activism
During World War I, Kulchytska depicted the sufferings of the civilian population and refugees. Her works were reproduced as postcards by the Ukrainian Women's Committee to Aid Wounded Soldiers in Vienna.

Kulchytska was part of the civil resistance movement under Stalinism. She helped the families of those who were repressed and deported to Siberia.

In 1955, Kulchytska began campaigning against the closure of the Lviv Art College. She financially supported the Union for the Liberation of Ukraine.

Legacy
Kulchytska donated a collection—including more than 3,000 pieces—of her own artwork to the Lviv Museum of Ukrainian Art in 1950. In 1971, a memorial museum of her work was posthumously opened in Lviv.

References

Further reading

External links
 Olena Kulchytska in Internet Encyclopedia of Ukraine
 Olena Kulchytska in Ukrainian Art Library
 See an issue dedicated to Olena Kulchytska in Halytska Brama, №9-10 (2007)

1877 births
1967 deaths
20th-century Ukrainian painters
People from Berezhany
Recipients of the title of People's Painter of Ukraine
Recipients of the Order of the Red Banner of Labour
Recipients of the Shevchenko National Prize
Soviet painters
Soviet printmakers
Ukrainian printmakers
Ukrainian women painters
Burials at Lychakiv Cemetery